Valaikurichi is a village in the Udayarpalayam taluk of Ariyalur district, Tamil Nadu, India.

Demographics 

As per the 2001 census, Valaikurichi had a total population of 1910 with 986 males and 924 females.

References 

Villages in Ariyalur district